Hendrik (Henk) Tennekes (born December 13, 1936, Kampen died July 3, 2021, Arnhem) was the director of research at the Royal Dutch Meteorological Institute (Koninklijk Nederlands Meteorologisch Instituut, or KNMI), and was a Professor of Aeronautical Engineering at Pennsylvania State University and Professor of Meteorology at the Vrije Universiteit Amsterdam (Free University (VU) in Amsterdam). He is known for his work in the fields of turbulence and multi-modal forecasting. He authored the textbooks The Simple Science of Flight: From Insects to Jumbo Jets and A First Course in Turbulence with John L. Lumley. The book "A First Course in Turbulence", is a classic that logs more than 2,000 citations on Google Scholar.

Tennekes has stressed the limited predictability of complex systems and the limited value of predictions based on scientific modeling.

He was a member of the Royal Netherlands Academy of Arts and Sciences (Koninklijke Nederlandse Akademie van Wetenschappen, KNAW) from 1982 – 2010.

Controversy 

In an interview in the Dutch paper De Telegraaf, Tennekes says he was ousted from his position at the Royal Dutch Meteorological Institute due to his skepticism over climate change.  After publishing a column critical of climate model accuracy, Tennekes says he was told "within two years, you'll be out on the street".

Books 
The Simple Science of Flight, MIT Press, 1997. 
The Simple Science of Flight. From Insects to Jumbo Jets. Revised and Expanded Edition, 2009. MIT Press. Paperback 
A First Course in Turbulence, with John L. Lumley, MIT Press, 1972.

References

External links 
 The Lorenz paradigm and the limitations of climate models
 A Personal Call For Modesty, Integrity, and Balance

1936 births
Living people
Dutch meteorologists
People from Kampen, Overijssel
Fluid dynamicists
Aerodynamicists
Pennsylvania State University faculty
Members of the Royal Netherlands Academy of Arts and Sciences
Dutch flight instructors